Resurrectionist may refer to:

Resurrectionist, one who practises body snatching
Resurrectionists in the United Kingdom
Resurrectionist Order of the Roman Catholic Church
 Resurrectionist (novel), a 2007 historical adventure novel by James McGee
 The Resurrectionists, a 2000 horror novel by Kim Wilkins